On December 5, 2007, 19-year-old Robert Hawkins shot and killed eight people and wounded four others in a Von Maur department store at Westroads Mall in Omaha, Nebraska, before committing suicide by shooting himself in the head. It was the deadliest mass murder in Nebraska since the rampage of Charles Starkweather in 1958.

Prior to shooting
An hour before the rampage, Hawkins' mother gave the Sarpy County Sheriff's Department his suicide note, which read in part: "I just want to take a few pieces of shit with me... just think tho, I'm gonna be fuckin famous."

Surveillance footage showed that Hawkins, unarmed at first, entered the south entrance of the Von Maur department store at about 1:36 p.m. CST (19:36 UTC). After walking a short distance into the store, he scanned the area, turned around and left. Returning six minutes later through the same entrance, he proceeded directly to the elevator at his immediate right, this time with a Century WASR-10 (a commercial copy of the AKM (7.62×39mm) semi-automatic rifle) stolen from his stepfather's house, along with two 30-round magazines taped together, concealed in a sweatshirt. He took the elevator to the top floor.

Shooting
At approximately 1:43 p.m. CST (19:43 UTC), Hawkins stepped out of the elevator on the third floor and opened fire. He first killed two women standing by some clothing racks before firing down the atrium, killing two men on the first and second floors. He then wounded two people on the third floor, one fatally, before walking to the customer service desk, where he shot several people, killing three. Hawkins then committed suicide by shooting himself up the chin. He fired more than 30 rounds, striking 12 people. Six were killed instantly, one died before reaching the hospital, and another died 45 minutes after reaching the ER of another hospital.

Omaha Police arrived at Westroads Mall about six minutes after receiving the first 911 call. Audio tapes and transcripts of the 911 calls, along with images captured by mall security surveillance cameras, were released by the police on December 7, 2007. In one 911 call, gunshots can be heard.

An autopsy of Hawkins showed that he had 200 nanograms per millilitre of Valium in his system, which is the low end of its therapeutic-use range (100–1500 ng/mL). No trace of any other drug was found in his system.

Victims
Eight people were killed by Hawkins during the shooting. Six were employees at the Von Maur store and the remaining two were customers. They are:

Beverly Flynn, 47 (employee)
Janet Jorgensen, 66 (employee)
Gary Joy, 56 (employee)
John McDonald, 65 (customer)
Gary Scharf, 48 (customer)
Angie Schuster, 36 (department manager)
Dianne Trent, 53 (employee)
Maggie Webb, 24 (store manager)

Four of the victims shot by Hawkins survived. Two critically injured were store employees. Fred Wilson, 61, was a manager for the customer service department. He was sent to the University of Nebraska Medical Center with a gunshot wound to the upper chest.  By the time he reached the ER, he had lost three-quarters of his blood and had no pulse.  Wilson was upgraded to stable by the following weekend, and soon after was making some attempts to communicate. The other critically wounded victim was customer service employee Micheale "Mickey" Oldham, 65, who was sent to Creighton University Medical Center. She sustained heavy injuries to the abdomen and back, and, of the surviving victims, she suffered the worst injuries.

Another surviving victim was customer Jeff Schaffart, 34, who was treated and released at UNMC for a gunshot wound to the left arm and the little finger of his left hand. The Omaha Police Department announced on December 22, 2007, that Mandy Hyda, 34, received a bruise when a bullet fragment struck her left leg. She was neither transported nor treated for the injury. It was initially reported that there were five people injured (not including Hyda), but two of those at the scene who were sent to local hospitals were sent for reasons other than being shot by Hawkins.

Perpetrator
Robert Arthur Hawkins was the 19-year-old perpetrator of the Westroads Mall shooting. He was born at the RAF Lakenheath station in Suffolk, England, U.K., to American U.S. Air Force personnel parents Ronald Hawkins and Maribel "Molly" Rodriguez. He was hospitalized at the age of four after persistent violent behavior in pre-school. He was diagnosed with attention-deficit disorder and posttraumatic stress disorder due to his chaotic homelife. The day after he turned 14, he was sent to a mental health treatment center for threatening to kill his stepmother. Four months later, he became a ward of the State of Nebraska, which lasted nearly four years until he was discharged completely due to his unwillingness to improve. 

During his second hospitalization, he was diagnosed with an unspecified mood disorder and oppositional defiant disorder. His treatments cost the state $265,000. He was expelled from Fort Calhoun High School after trying to sell drugs to his classmates in 2005. He then attended Papillion-La Vista High School, and later dropped out in March 2006. He received a GED. Debora Maruca-Kovac, the owner of the house in which Hawkins lived, described him as "troubled". She also stated that he was depressed over being fired from his job at McDonald's, reportedly for stealing $17, and over separating from his girlfriend two weeks prior to the incident because he cheated on her. In the summer of 2007, Hawkins tried to enlist in the U.S. Army but was turned down on account of his mental health record.

Hawkins was ticketed on November 24, 2007, for suspicion of contributing to the delinquency of a minor and two alcohol charges, one of which was underage possession of alcohol. He was due in court for an arraignment on December 19, 2007. In late November, 2007, Hawkins threatened to kill a local teenager's family and burn her house down, because he thought she had stolen his CD player. The teen decided to press no charges because Hawkins was known for "shooting his mouth off". Hawkins was also convicted as a juvenile of a felony drug conviction while in foster care in Omaha.

Aftermath 

In the days following the tragedy, the Von Maur store was thronged on all sides by flowers and signs expressing condolences, as makeshift memorials to the victims. By January 12, 2008, a fund for the victims' families surpassed one million dollars.

The Smoking Gun released a copy of Hawkins' three-page suicide note which consisted of a note to his family, one to his friends, and his last will and testament, below which he signed his name and included his Social Security number. Initial news reports indicated that Hawkins wrote in his suicide note, "I'm going out in style"; however, the phrase does not appear on the publicly released document.

On January 7, 2009, Hawkins' mother Maribel Rodriguez was featured on season 7 episode 77 of the Dr. Phil show. Hawkins was the subject of the series premiere of the Investigation Discovery series Evil Lives Here, a show that features testimonials of the loved ones of murderers, which premiered on January 17, 2016. It was his father and ex-stepmother's first public interviews since the shooting.

Dutch DJ and producer Angerfist sampled an excerpt from a news story about the shooting on his track "The Road to Fame" on the Retaliate album, released in 2011.

Reactions
The Von Maur corporate headquarters in Davenport, Iowa issued a statement saying, "We are deeply saddened by the horrific shooting at our Omaha store this afternoon. Our thoughts and prayers are with the victims of this tragic event, as well as their families." A similar statement was shown on its web site's home page.  Westroads Mall also stated on its web site, "Our thoughts and prayers remain with all affected by this tragedy." Its home page also indicated that the mall would remain closed until the following Saturday, December 8; however, the Von Maur store, where the incident took place, did not open until December 20. 
The day after the shooting, the Hawkins family released a statement expressing their condolences for the victims. On December 13, 2007, Hawkins' mother, Maribel Rodriguez, issued a formal apology for Hawkins' actions in an interview on Good Morning America.

See also

List of rampage killers in the United States
List of massacres
2016 Munich shooting
Cascade Mall shooting
St. Cloud, Minnesota mall stabbing
2007 Colorado YWAM and New Life shootings

References

External links
 Complete coverage from the Omaha World-Herald

2007 murders in the United States
Mass murder in 2007
2007 mass shootings in the United States
Mass shootings in the United States
History of Omaha, Nebraska
Murder–suicides in the United States
Massacres in the United States
Crimes in Omaha, Nebraska
Deaths by firearm in Nebraska
Murder in Nebraska
2007 in Nebraska
Suicides by firearm in Nebraska
Filmed killings
Attacks on shopping malls
Attacks in the United States in 2007
December 2007 crimes
December 2007 events in the United States
Mass shootings in Nebraska
Attacks on buildings and structures in the United States